Thomas Felix Rosenbaum (born February 20, 1955) is an American physicist and the current president of the California Institute of Technology. Earlier he served as Provost and on the faculty of the University of Chicago, and was the Vice President for Research at Argonne National Laboratory.

Early life and education
Rosenbaum attended Forest Hills High School in Queens, New York City, and he was a finalist in the 1973 Westinghouse Science Talent Search. He received his bachelor's degree in physics with honors from Harvard University in 1977, and a Ph.D. in physics from Princeton University in 1982.

Career 
He conducted research at Bell Laboratories, Murray Hill, NJ and at IBM Thomas J. Watson Research Center, Yorktown Heights, NY before he joined the University of Chicago faculty in 1983. From January 2007, Rosenbaum served as the Provost of the University of Chicago. In addition to his responsibilities for academic and research programs across the University, Rosenbaum served and continues to serve on the board of governors for Argonne National Laboratory. He directed the University's Materials Research Laboratory from 1991 to 1994, the University's James Franck Institute, an interdisciplinary research unit, from 1995 to 2001, and served as Vice President for Research and for Argonne National Laboratory from 2002 to 2006. He is a member of the board of directors of the Bulletin of the Atomic Scientists and the Santa Fe Institute Science Board, a Trustee of the National Opinion Research Center (NORC), and a Trustee of the University of Chicago Medical Center. Rosenbaum was announced as the eighth president of The California Institute of Technology on the morning of October 24, 2013 and took office at Caltech on or about July 1, 2014. Rosenbaum was formally inaugurated into the office on October 24, 2014.

Research 
His research focuses on the behavior of matter at temperatures near absolute zero where quantum mechanical effects are manifest. Rosenbaum recognized early the significance and ubiquity of quantum phase transitions—from metal–insulator transitions to magnetism to exotic superconductivity—and his work is recognized as putting quantum transitions on as solid a footing as that long available for classical transitions. He has both exploited and advanced methods in experimental low temperature physics, developing new techniques (hydrostatic pressure, stress, magnetometry, calorimetry) for high-resolution studies at milliKelvin temperatures, complementing laboratory dilution refrigerator approaches with synchrotron x-ray measurements in diamond anvil cells at cryogenic temperatures. He established the nature of the metal-insulator transition in doped semiconductors and correlated materials, and demonstrated macroscopic anisotropy of non-s-wave superconductivity in heavy fermion compounds. Rosenbaum’s experiments on magnets involve controllable tuning of quantum fluctuations in both ordered and disordered systems. He is interested in the macroscopic manifestations of quantum mechanics and harnessing disorder to craft a material’s electrical, magnetic, and optical response.

Honors
His honors include an Alfred P. Sloan Research Fellowship, an NSF Presidential Young Investigator Award, and the William McMillan Award for "outstanding contributions to condensed matter physics". Rosenbaum is an elected Fellow of the American Physical Society, the American Association for the Advancement of Science, and the American Academy of Arts and Sciences.

References

Notes

Research and Publications of Thomas F. Rosenbaum: http://quantum.uchicago.edu/

External links
University of Chicago
Santa Fe Institute

Living people
1955 births
21st-century American physicists
Princeton University alumni
Harvard University alumni
University of Chicago faculty
Fellows of the American Physical Society
Fellows of the American Academy of Arts and Sciences
Fellows of the American Association for the Advancement of Science
Santa Fe Institute people
Presidents of the California Institute of Technology
Quantum information scientists